Margarida Borràs is the assumed name of a transgender woman or a homosexual man cross-dresser executed under anti-sodomy laws in Valencia in 1460.
The case has become  an icon of LGBT rights in Valencia since 1995, when it was discussed by  Vicent Josep Escartí, professor at the University of Valencia and 
the Margarida Borràs Award was created for "persons and institutions that stand out in the defense of LGBT-rights and against all discrimination on the ground of sexuality or gender". In January 2016, a square in Valencia was named after her.

Margarida Borràs was born Miquel as the son of a wealthy official from Mallorca. She changed her name to Margarida and dressed and lived as a woman in Valencia.
Borràs  was arrested, subjected to torture, and executed by hanging on 28 July 1460.

References

 
  La força dels somnis. 25 anys lambda. Catàleg de la mostra expositiva del Col·lectiu Lambda de lesbianes, gais, transsexuals i bisexuals celebrada amb motiu del seu 25é aniversari (1986 - 2011)  (2012), felgtb.org 
 

LGBT rights in Spain
15th-century births
1460 deaths
15th-century people from the Kingdom of Aragon
Transgender women
Male-to-female cross-dressers
Spanish transgender people
Executed Spanish people
People prosecuted under anti-homosexuality laws
Medieval LGBT people
People executed by Spain by hanging
15th-century executions